Tufton is a small village in Hampshire, England, on the River Test. St Mary's Church dates from the 13th century and contains a large early 15th-century painting of Saint Christopher on the north wall of nave. Its nearest town is Whitchurch, which lies approximately 1 mile north from the village.

External links
 Hampshire Treasures Volume 2 (Basingstoke and Deane) Page 144 - Hurstbourne Priors
 Tufton, Hampshire - St Mary Church
 GENUKI: Tufton, Hampshire genealogy
 History of Tufton, in Basingstoke and Deane and Hampshire | Map and description

Villages in Hampshire
Basingstoke and Deane
Former civil parishes in Hampshire